Ranford is a town in Western Australia.

Ranford may also refer to:
Ranford Road, a road in Perth, Australia
Ranford (surname), a surname